Sherkhan Farnood ( – ) was an Afghan banker,  Chairman of Kabul Bank until late 2010, which is Afghanistan's largest private financial institution with over 1 million customers. Farnood held 28.16% of the shares in the Kabul Bank. He also owned Pamir Airways, in partnership with Khalilullah Fruzi/Frozi, Mohammed Fahim and possibly others.  According to media reports, by November 2010 Da Afghanistan Bank insisted both Farnood and Kabul Bank chief executive Frozi had been removed from bank management;. As of early 2011 both were effectively under house arrest and could not leave the country.

An ethnic Uzbek, Farnood is originally from the northern Kunduz Province of Afghanistan. He studied chemical engineering full-time while simultaneously running a business in Moscow, Russia. During the 1980s and 1990s, he ran a hawala, or an informal money transfer organization in Moscow. 

Farnood became a prominent poker player, he took part in the 2008 World Series of Poker Europe (WSOPE) and won his first bracelet. Prior to his detention, he spent most of his time in Dubai, United Arab Emirates, where he owned a number of villas under his name on Palm Jumeirah.

On 24 August 2018, Farnood died in prison at the age of 55, apparently due to natural causes.

References 

1963 births
2018 deaths
Afghan businesspeople
Afghan bankers
Afghan poker players
Afghan Uzbek people
World Series of Poker bracelet winners
Afghan expatriates in the United Arab Emirates
People from Kunduz Province